"Selfish Jean" is a song by Scottish alternative rock band Travis, released as the second single from their fifth studio album, The Boy with No Name on 9 July 2007.

Lyrics
The title of the song is a reference to The Selfish Gene, a popular science book about evolution by Richard Dawkins. The song was written by Fran Healy in 2005 in his apartment in New York, and was demoed using Healy's own computer. He sampled the drum intro from the Iggy Pop song "Lust For Life", looped it to create a basic rhythm, and then played the song and recorded vocals over the top of the rhythm track. The demo was then taken to Travis drummer Neil Primrose as an example of what to play, and thus, the song exists in its current form. The lyrics for the song's bridge are taken directly from an earlier B-side, "Standing On My Own", which appeared on the 1997 single "Tied to the 90s".

Background
The single found its way onto the BBC Radio 2 playlist, receiving around twenty plays per week. Even though it charted at a relatively disappointing No. 30 on the UK Singles Chart, it is a song much loved by Travis fans and is performed at a majority of Travis concerts. B-sides for the single include the newly written song "You Bring Me Down", as well as two Squeeze covers—"Is That Love" and "Pulling Mussels (From the Shell)".  It currently remains, their last UK Top 40 hit.

Music video
The music video was released on the band's MySpace page  before the release of The Boy with No Name. Directed by American comedian Demetri Martin, the video features Martin who begins by wearing 19 T-shirts with words and pictures to illustrate lyrics from the song, removing them to progressively reveal the T-shirts underneath. Some of these T-shirts have been recreated for sale: 'Aaaaahh... Selfish Jean', stretching from the back and rotating around to the front, and 'Art, Music, Jaffa Cakes', with additional tick boxes, which have been very popular among fans.

Track listing
 UK CD Single
 "Selfish Jean" - 4:00
 "You Bring Me Down" - 3:23
 "Selfish Jean" (Video)

 7" Vinyl #1
 "Selfish Jean" - 4:00
 "Is That Love" - 4:18

 7" Vinyl #2
 "Selfish Jean" - 4:00
 "Pulling Mussels (From The Shell)" - 2:43

 European Single
 "Selfish Jean" - 4:00
 "You Bring Me Down" - 3:23
 "Is That Love" - 4:18
 "Pulling Mussels (From The Shell)" - 2:43
 "Selfish Jean" (Video)

Charts

References

2007 singles
Travis (band) songs
Songs written by Fran Healy (musician)
Song recordings produced by Nigel Godrich
2007 songs
Independiente (record label) singles